One Who Came Back is a 1951 American short documentary film produced by Owen Crump and the National Organization of Disabled American Veterans in cooperation with the United States Department of Defense and the Association of Motion Picture Producers, about an American soldier wounded in the Korean War, rescued from behind enemy lines and transported back to the United States. It was nominated for an Academy Award for Best Documentary Short.

References

External links

One Who Came Back at the National Archives and Records Administration

1951 films
1951 documentary films
1951 short films
American short documentary films
American black-and-white films
Black-and-white documentary films
1950s short documentary films
Documentary films about the Korean War
Documentary films about veterans
Documentary films about people with disability
Korean War films
1950s English-language films
1950s American films